Alexey Stepanov (January 20, 1960, Leningrad, USSR – June 30, 2002, Ekaterinburg, Russia) – Russian football and futsal player, defender.

Biography
Stepanov started playing football in famous Petersburg school Smena. Most part of career he spent in Zenit Saint Petersburg, where he won Soviet Top League in 1984. Stepanov finished his career in Lokomotiv Saint-Petersburg in 1992.
 
In 1991 – 1994 performed in futsal club Dina. For three times won CIS and Russian championship. Played 15 matches for national futsal team. The first captain in history of Russian futsal team. Member of Russian side on Futsal World Championship 1992.
 
In 2001 worked as sport director of Zenit. In 2002 became a president of FC Tyumen.
 
On 30 June 2002 died in Ekaterinburg due to heart attack.

Achievements

Club
Soviet Top League winner: 1984

CIS Futsal Championship winner: 1992

Russian Futsal Championship winner: 1992/93, 1993/94

Individual
Russian Futsal Championship best defender: 1992

One of two players (with Boris Chuhlov) in history who won national championship both in football and futsal

External links 
 nevasport.ru 

1960 births
2002 deaths
Russian men's futsal players
Soviet footballers
Footballers from Saint Petersburg
Association football defenders
FC Zenit Saint Petersburg players
FC Dynamo Saint Petersburg players
MFK Dina Moskva players